Tajikistan competed at the World Games 2017  in Wroclaw, Poland, from 20 July 2017 to 30 July 2017.

Competitors

Kickboxing
Tajikistan has qualified at the 2017 World Games:

Women's -52 kg – 1 quota (Zuhro Kholova)

References 

Nations at the 2017 World Games
2017 in Tajikistani sport
Tajikistan at multi-sport events